Gustavo Nicolás Aguirre (born 31 March 1988) is an Argentine professional basketball player, currently playing for Flamengo Basketball of the New Basketball Brazil.

Professional career
Aguirre was the Argentine Super 8 Cup MVP in 2014, and the Argentine League's MVP in 2015.

National team career
Aguirre represented the senior Argentine national basketball team at the 2015 Pan American Games, in Toronto, Canada.

References

External links
 FIBA Profile
 Latinbasket.com Profile
 Realgm.com Profile
 Nicolas Aguirre - Youtube.com Video

1988 births
Living people
Argentine men's basketball players
Basketball players at the 2015 Pan American Games
Boca Juniors basketball players
Juventud Sionista basketball players
La Unión basketball players
People from Santiago del Estero
Point guards
Quilmes de Mar del Plata basketball players
Quimsa basketball players
San Lorenzo de Almagro (basketball) players
Shooting guards
Pan American Games competitors for Argentina
Sportspeople from Santiago del Estero Province